Heptafluoride typically refers to compounds with the formula RnMxF7y− or RnMxF7y+, where n, x, and y are independent variables and R any substituent.

Binary heptafluorides
The only binary heptafluorides are iodine heptafluoride (IF7), rhenium heptafluoride (ReF7), and gold heptafluoride (AuF7).  Only IF7 and ReF7 are true heptafluorides, however, as AuF7 is actually a coordination complex of gold pentafluoride (AuF5) and molecular fluorine; therefore, the correct chemical formula of gold heptafluoride is actually AuF5·F2.

Heptafluoride anions
A commercially important heptafluoride anion is the heptafluorotantalate anion, TaF72−.  It is an intermediate in the purification of tantalum.  Many dimeric and oligomeric heptafluorides have been observed or proposed.  One example is B2F7−.

In the area of organofluorine chemistry, many heptafluorides are known.  A prominent example is heptafluorobutyric acid.  This species and its conjugate base heptafluorobutyrate (C3F7CO2−) are precursors to surfactants.

Complex heptafluorides
Many compounds that are not discrete ions or molecules also are heptafluorides.

References

Fluorides